Last Tycoon (9 May 1983 – 27 May 2006) was an Irish bred Thoroughbred racehorse best known for winning the Breeders' Cup Mile and as a leading sire in Australia.

Background
Last Tycoon was bred in Ireland by his owner Richard C. Strauss's Kilfrush Stud Ltd.

Racing career
He was trained by Robert Collet from his base at Chantilly Racecourse. At age two Last Tycoon won three of his six starts including the Prix d'Arenberg at Chantilly.

At age three the colt won two conditions races in England and two in France before being sent to Santa Anita Park in Arcadia, California for the Breeders' Cup Mile. Lightly regarded by bettors who sent him off at 36:1 odds, under regular jockey, Yves Saint-Martin, Last Tycoon defeated thirteen runners to win the US$1 million event.

Stud record
Retired to stud duty, Last Tycoon met with considerable success. He first stood in Ireland where he was third on the annual sires list in 1992 before being sent to Australia where he was the Leading sire in 1994. Overall, he sired 756 winners, including 48 stake/group winners, and nine champions. Last Tycoon's notable progeny includes:
 Bigstone, won Queen Elizabeth II Stakes and Prix d' Ispahan 
 Ezzoud (1989) – won the G1 Eclipse Stakes (1994) and twice the G1 International Stakes in 1993 and 1994;
 Iglesia (1989)- Current 1200 metre record holder at Flemington(1.07.16).Sire of Written Tycoon.
 Knowledge (1994) – won Australia's G1 Blue Diamond Stakes;
 Lady Jakeo, won MVRC Australia Made Stakes and VATC Blue Diamond Stakes 
 Le Zagaletta (1995 ) – multiple stakes winner, Millionaire racehorse in Australia. 
 Lost World (IRE), won FR Grand Criterium 
 Magic of Money, won AJC The Galaxy 
 Mahogany – 1994 Australian Champion Racehorse of the Year, won the Australian Derby and Victoria Derby;
 Marju (1988) – winner of England's Craven Stakes and the Group One St. James's Palace Stakes. Sire of Soviet Song, Viva Pataca, Indigenous;
 O'Reilly (NZ) won the Levin Classic and Telegraph Handicap and had a successful stud career in New Zealand.
 Taipan (1992) – Italian Champion Older Horse (1997, 1998), German Champion Older Horse (1998); 
 Tracy's Element (AUS) 1990, won SAF Computaform Sprint and SAF Star Sprint etc.
 Tycoon Lil won Canterbury Guineas and New Zealand Oaks.

Last Tycoon died on 30 June 2006 at Arrow Stud in Japan.

References

1983 racehorse births
2006 racehorse deaths
Breeders' Cup Mile winners
Champion Thoroughbred Sires of Australia
Racehorses bred in Ireland
Racehorses trained in France
Racehorses trained in the United States
Thoroughbred family 8-c